Kao Hao-chieh (born 24 July 1980) is a Taiwanese football player who currently plays for Tatung F.C. as a defender. 

Kao represented Chinese Taipei in 2006 FIFA World Cup qualification (2004) and East Asian Cup 2005 and became regular squad in 2007 AFC Asian Cup qualification (2006).

References

1980 births
Living people
Taiwanese footballers
Tatung F.C. players
Chinese Taipei international footballers
Association football defenders